Sergey Mikhailovich Bogdanchikov (in , born August 10, 1957, in Severny District, Orenburg Oblast, Soviet Union) is a Russian manager.

He received a degree from Buguruslansky Gas Technicum in 1976.  In 1981, Bogdanchikov earned a PhD (Kandidat Nauk) from Ufa Gas Institute.

Since October 16, 1998 he has been the President of Rosneft. Since November 1, 2004, after Gazprom bought oligarch's Abramovich oil company Sibneft which was renamed to Gazprom Neft, he has been the Director General of the latter.

Bogdanchikov's son, Yevgeny, married Viktor Khristenko's daughter, Yulia in the Spring of 2004.

Honours and awards
 Order of Merit for the Fatherland:
3rd class (10 August 2007) - for outstanding contribution to the development of oil and gas industry, labour achievements and many years of diligent work
4th class (30 August 2002) - for outstanding contribution to the development of fuel-energy complex
 Medal of Honour (18 September 1995) - for active participation in the aftermath of the 1995 Neftegorsk earthquake and displaying courage, dedication and professionalism
 Honoured Oil and Gas Industry of the Russian Federation (11 September 1998) - for outstanding contribution to the development of oil and gas industry in the Sakhalin region and years of diligent work in joint-stock company "Rosneft-Sakhalinmorneftegaz"
 Prize of the Russian Federation in science and technology (2005) - for the development and implementation of effective high-tech equipment for repair and maintenance of oil and gas wells up to 6,000 metres
 Honorary Oilman
 Order of St. Seraphim of Sarov, 2nd class (Russian Orthodox Church, 2010)

External links 
 Bogdanchikov's Official Biography from Rosneft
 Biography 

1957 births
Living people
People from Severny District, Orenburg Oblast
Russian businesspeople in the oil industry
Recipients of the Order "For Merit to the Fatherland", 3rd class
Recipients of the Order of Honour (Russia)
Rosneft